John Thomas Spriggs (April 5, 1825 – December 23, 1888) was an American lawyer and politician who served two terms as a U.S. Representative from New York from 1883 to 1887.

Biography 
Born in Peterborough, England, J. Thomas Spriggs immigrated to the United States with his parents, who settled in Whitesboro, New York in 1836.
He attended Hamilton College, and graduated from Union College in 1848.

He studied law and was admitted to the bar in 1848 and began practice in Whitesboro. He became prosecuting attorney of Oneida County in 1853, and county treasurer in 1854. He served as mayor of Utica, New York from 1868 to 1880, and as delegate to the Democratic National Convention in 1860, 1872 and 1880.

Congress 
Spriggs was elected as a Democrat to the Forty-eighth and Forty-ninth Congresses (March 4, 1883 – March 3, 1887).
He served as chairman of the Committee on Accounts (Forty-ninth Congress).
He was an unsuccessful candidate for reelection in 1886 to the Fiftieth Congress.

Later career and death 
After leaving Congress, he resumed the practice of law.

He died in Utica on December 23, 1888 and was buried in Whitesboro Cemetery in Whitesboro.

Sources

1825 births
1888 deaths
Mayors of Utica, New York
Union College (New York) alumni
Democratic Party members of the United States House of Representatives from New York (state)
People from Peterborough
People from Whitesboro, New York
19th-century American politicians